Armanak may refer to:
 Armanak-e Olya
 Armanak-e Sofla